Four Sided Triangle is a 1953 British science-fiction film directed by Terence Fisher, adapted from the 1949 novel by William F. Temple. It stars Stephen Murray, Barbara Payton and James Hayter. It was produced by Hammer Film Productions at Bray Studios.

The film deals with the moral and scientific themes (not to mention "mad lab" scenes) that were soon to put Hammer Films on the map with the same director's The Curse of Frankenstein. Four Sided Triangle has most in common with Fisher's Frankenstein Created Woman (1967).

Plot
Dr Harvey, a rural physician, breaks the fourth wall to relate an unusual occurrence that happened in his village.  The bulk of the story is told in flashback.

Bill and Robin are boyhood friends who compete for the affections of Lena, a beautiful girl about their own age. Lena's family moves away, and in adulthood the two men become scientists. They collaborate on the Reproducer, a machine that can exactly duplicate physical objects.

Lena returns to the village, and Bill and Robin's forgotten childhood feelings return. In time they abandon their work on the Reproducer, and Robin leaves the village to learn his family's business. Bill is disappointed to discover that Lena loves Robin and intends to marry him.

Hoping that he can win Lena's affections, Bill convinces her to allow him to use the Reproducer to create a duplicate of her. The experiment succeeds and Bill names the duplicate "Helen". Because Helen is an exact copy, when she is introduced to Robin she also falls in love with him. Bill believes that electric shock therapy can be used to erase Helen's knowledge of Robin. Not wishing to compete with Lena for Robin's affections, Helen agrees to the therapy. Bill convinces Lena to help him with the procedure. The process proceeds as planned, but the apparatus overheats, explodes and causes a terrific fire.

Robin and Dr Harvey arrive in time to rescue a woman from the fire. Bill and the other woman perish in the flames. Harvey, having been briefed on the situation by Robin, discovers that the woman has amnesia. The two men wonder whom they have saved. Dr Harvey recalls that Bill had to start Helen's heart with a device that he attached to the back of her neck, leaving two scars. Robin is relieved to find that there are no marks on the neck of the woman they have rescued: she is Lena.

Production details
Four Sided Triangle was an early effort by Hammer Films. The laboratory set includes "a welter of retorts, alembics, rheostats and plain, old neon tubing". This chaotic, improvised laboratory setting has been contrasted with the sophisticated labs portrayed in the Universal Horror films of the 1930s. The film relies on a minimum of trick photography and special effects, which may have been compromised by its limited budget.

Filming over two days of the five-week schedule took place at Lulworth Cove in August 1952 and was photographed by George Douglas for the magazine Picture Post (issue of 30 August).

Differences from the novel
Four Sided Triangle features some differences from the original novel by William F. Temple. In the novel the duplicate, named Dorothy and nicknamed Dot, falls into a depression over being married to Bill while she is in love with Robin. She has a breakdown and has to go on holiday with Bill to recover. After they return Bill starts working on a power generator, which explodes, killing him. Lena tries to convince Robin to accept both her and Dot, but he refuses. A couple of weeks later Lena and Dot have an accident while diving in a river. One of them dies and the other is seriously injured. Dr Harvey and Robin are startled when they discover that the surviving woman cannot recall anything after the duplication and they suppose that she is repressing painful memories, so she may be Dot. Dr Harvey finds out about the marks on Dot's neck in Bill's notes and tells Robin, convincing him that the survivor is Lena. In an epilogue he reveals that he also discovered a note in which Bill recalled that during her holiday Dot had undergone plastic surgery to erase the marks, which means that there is no way of knowing whether the survivor is Lena or Dot. Dr Harvey destroys the note, enabling Robin and Lena, or Dot, to remain happy in the belief that the survivor is Lena.

Cast

 Barbara Payton as Lena Maitland/Helen
 James Hayter as Dr Harvey
 Stephen Murray as Bill Leggat
 John Van Eyssen as Robin Grant
 Percy Marmont as Sir Walter
 Glyn Dearman as Bill in childhood
 Sean Barrett as Robin in childhood
 Jennifer Dearman as Lena in childhood
 Kynaston Reeves as Lord Grant
 John Stuart as the solicitor
 Edith Saville as Lady Grant

References

Sources
Hearne, Marcus, and Jonathan Rigby. Four Sided Triangle: Viewing Notes (accompanying R2 DVD release)

External links 

 
 

1953 films
1950s science fiction films
British science fiction films
Films directed by Terence Fisher
Films scored by Malcolm Arnold
Films shot at Bray Studios
Films set in England
Hammer Film Productions films
Films based on science fiction novels
Films based on British novels
British black-and-white films
1950s English-language films
1950s British films